The École nationale d'ingénieurs du Val de Loire (ENIVL) is a French grande école leading to the French “Diplôme d’Ingénieur” under the authority of the French Ministry of Education and Research. It is a public school accredited by the Commission for engineering qualifications (CTI) to deliver an engineering degree. The ENIVL is a 5-year school.

In September 2014, ENIVL became a member of the network of the National Institutes of Applied Sciences (INSA), merging with the National School of Engineers of Bourges (ENSIB) to give INSA Val de Loire.

Admission 
The first year admission to the ENIVL is made through a selective examination during the year leading to the baccalauréat (S serie). To enter the school for 2nd, 3rd and 4th year, admission is through various examinations: E3a, ENSEA, and Banque PT.

Study Program 
2 years Preparatory course
3 years Engineering Cycle  including a 6-months internship
The ENVL trains multipurpose generalist engineers and land intended for the production function: Design, manufacturing, maintenance, purchasing, procurement, management of internal flows, analytical management, logistics, people management, methods, ...

Specialization 

At the ENIVL
Industrial purchasing engineering (IAI)
Operational Safety and Industrial Systems (SDF-SI)
Production methods, Automotive, Transport (PMAT)
Production and Methods (PM) 
 Automotive and Transportation (AT)
Automated Systems, Industrial Computing and Instrumentation (SA3I)
Instrumentation and Automated Systems course (ISA) 
 Computer Science  and Industrial Systems (ISI)

Partnership with another ENI
Logistics and Industrial Management (LGI)

Partnership with foreign universities
Biomedical Engineering (Germany, Scotland)
Mechanical and Aerospace (Argentina)
Acoustics (Spain)
French (USA)

International 
In 2010/2011 124 of 465 students are on mobility 
35 partnership agreements with foreign universities
72% mobility offerings are submitted by school

Research Laboratories 
LMR laboratory (Laboratory of Mechanics and Rheology)
The ACOUSTIC and piezoelectric POLE is a component of GREMAN (Materials Research Group, Microelectronics, and Nanotechnologies Acoustic), a laboratory associated with CNRS.

See also 
Grandes Ecoles
Diplome d'ingénieur
ENI Group
Engineer
Baccalauréat

References

1993 establishments in France
Educational institutions established in 1993
Engineering universities and colleges in France
Grandes écoles
Loir-et-Cher